Selanac is a village in Serbia. It is situated in the Ljubovija municipality, in the Mačva District of Central Serbia. The village had a Serb ethnic majority and a population of 485 in 2002.

Historical population

1948: 776
1953: 898
1961: 928
1971: 816
1981: 644
1991: 542
2002: 485

References

See also

List of places in Serbia

Populated places in Mačva District
Ljubovija